Anaplastic astrocytoma is a rare WHO grade III type of astrocytoma, which is a type of cancer of the brain. In the United States, the annual incidence rate for anaplastic astrocytoma is 0.44 per 100,000 people.

Signs and symptoms
Initial presenting symptoms most commonly are headache, depressed mental status, focal neurological deficits, and/or seizures. The growth rate and mean interval between onset of symptoms and diagnosis is approximately 1.5–2 years but is highly variable, being intermediate between that of low-grade astrocytomas and glioblastomas. Seizures are less common among patients with anaplastic astrocytomas compared to low-grade lesions.

Causes
Most high-grade gliomas occur sporadically or without identifiable cause. However, a small proportion (less than 5%) of persons with malignant astrocytoma have a definite or suspected hereditary predisposition. The main hereditary predispositions are mainly neurofibromatosis type I, Li-Fraumeni syndrome, hereditary nonpolyposis colorectal cancer and tuberous sclerosis. Anaplastic astrocytomas have also been associated with previous exposure to vinyl chloride and to high doses of radiation therapy to the brain.

Pathology
Anaplastic astrocytomas fall under the category of high grade gliomas (WHO grade III-IV), which are pathologically undifferentiated gliomas that carry a poor clinical prognosis.  Unlike glioblastomas (WHO grade IV), anaplastic astrocytomas lack vascular proliferation and necrosis on pathologic evaluation.  Compared to grade II tumors, anaplastic astrocytomas are more cellular, demonstrate more atypia, and mitoses are seen.

Treatment
The standard initial treatment is to remove as much of the tumor as possible without worsening neurologic deficits. Radiation therapy has been shown to prolong survival and is a standard component of treatment. There is no proven benefit to adjuvant chemotherapy or supplementing other treatments for this kind of tumor. Although temozolomide is effective for treating recurrent anaplastic astrocytoma, its role as an adjuvant to radiation therapy has not been fully tested.

Quality of life after treatment depends heavily on the area of the brain that housed the tumor. In many cases, patients with anaplastic astrocytoma may experience various types of paralysis, speech impediments, difficulties planning and skewed sensory perception. Most cases of paralysis and speech difficulties can be rehabilitated with speech, occupational, physical, and vision therapy.

Prognosis
The age-standardized 5-year relative survival rate is 23.6%. Patients with this tumor are 46 times more likely to die than matched members of the general population. It is important to note that prognosis across age groups is different especially during the first three years post-diagnosis. When the elderly population is compared with young adults, the excess hazard ratio (a hazard ratio that is corrected for differences in mortality across age groups) decreases from 10.15 to 1.85 at 1 to 3 years, meaning that the elderly population are much more likely to die in the first year post-diagnosis when compared to young adults (aged 15 to 40), but after three years, this difference is reduced markedly.
Typical median survival for anaplastic astrocytoma is 2–3 years.  Secondary progression to glioblastoma multiforme is common. Radiation, younger age, female sex, treatment after 2000, and surgery were associated with improved survival in AA patients.

References 

Brain tumor
Cancer
Types of cancer
Oncology